The Eon Olympia was a glider produced from 1947 by Elliotts of Newbury.

Design and development
Elliotts had been asked in 1945 by Chilton Aircraft Ltd to make one set of wings for the Chilton Olympia, a glider that had been developed in pre-war Germany as the DFS Olympia Meise. This had been designed by Hans Jacobs and selected as the glider for the 1940 Summer Olympics. The German drawings were not detailed and so new drawings were made by Chilton which retained the Meise Olympia's aerodynamic shape. The wing redesign resulted in a stronger and heavier (+30 kg) aircraft. To maintain employment at their factory, Elliotts refused to sell the wing jigs that they had made for the prototype. Consequently, Chilton gave up all aircraft work, agreeing to sell to Elliotts the production rights, fuselage jigs, and work in hand on all Olympia gliders.

Production of the Olympia (originally called Type 5) started in 1946 as a batch of 100, and the first flight was made in January 1947.  Elliotts and their design consultants Aviation & Engineering Products Ltd made improvements to the original design before starting production. Marks 1, 2 and 3 were produced, mainly distinguishable by the landing gear. The Mark 1 had only a skid whereas the Olympia 2 had a built-in main wheel. The Eon Olympia 3's wheel was jettisonable after takeoff. The first batch of 100 was completed in 1947 but the market could not absorb such a large number, despite the low price of £425. Even by 1953, 40 of the first 100 Olympias were still unsold. Nevertheless, a second batch of 50 was built. Gliders from the second batch were still being offered for sale for £800 as late as 1957 in order to clear the stock, despite being below cost price.

After building three marks of the Olympia, another improved version, called the EoN Olympia 4 was produced in 1954. This is regarded as being sufficiently different from the original as being a new type. This type in turn led to a succession of variants.

Operational history
On 24 August 1950 an Eon Olympia flown by Bill Bedford broke the British distance record by flying 310 km in 3:50 hr. On 2 May 1951 Bedford broke his record with a flight of 413 km from Farnborough to Newcastle. Olympias also broke height records on occasions, culminating in a flight by Gordon Rondel on 18 June 1960 in a thunderstorm to 9,321 m (30,580 ft) with gain of height of 8,870 m (29,100 ft), absolute National height and gain of height records. An example is now on display at the Gliding Heritage Centre.

Variants

Data from Ellison, 1971
EoN Type 5 Olympia 1Improved Olympia-Meise.  Landing skid.
EoN Type 5 Olympia 2Fixed monowheel.
EoN Type 5 Olympia 3 Jestisonable dolly wheels and skid.
EoN Type 5 Olympia 4 New wing section, NACA 643618 at root, 643421 at tip
EoN Type 5 Olympia 401 Revised 4, with new nose and square-cut empennage.  shorter.
EoN Type 5 Olympia 402 As 4, modified for 1956 World Gliding Championships with  span.
EoN Type 6 Olympia 403 1957 development of Olympia 402, with strengthened and shortened fuselage. New fin and rudder, all-moving tailplane.
Eon Type 6 Olympia 4151958 Standard class span version of 419.
Eon Type 6 Olympia 419 Long span, long fuselage version of 403.

Specifications (Olympia 2)

See also

Notes

References

Further reading

Michael Hardy, Gliders and Sailplanes of the World, Ian Allan, 1982,

External links
Technical details and three-view drawings at scalesoaring.co.uk
Detailed history at scalesoaring.co.uk

1940s British sailplanes
Glider aircraft
Olympia
High-wing aircraft
Aircraft first flown in 1947